Francis Elisha Baker (October 20, 1860 – March 15, 1924) was a United States circuit judge of the United States Court of Appeals for the Seventh Circuit and of the United States Circuit Courts for the Seventh Circuit.

Education and career

Born in Goshen, Indiana, Baker received a Bachelor of Arts degree from the University of Michigan in 1882 and read law to enter the bar in 1884. He was in private practice in Goshen from 1884 to 1899. He was a justice of the Indiana Supreme Court from January 2, 1899, to January 25, 1902.

Federal judicial service
Baker was nominated by President Theodore Roosevelt on December 11, 1901, to a joint seat on the United States Court of Appeals for the Seventh Circuit and the United States Circuit Courts for the Seventh Circuit vacated by Judge William Allen Woods. He was confirmed by the United States Senate on January 21, 1902, and received his commission the same day. On December 31, 1911, the Circuit Courts were abolished and he thereafter served only on the Court of Appeals. Following the retirement of Justice William R. Day, Judge Baker was on Warren G. Harding‘s shortlist to replace him on the Supreme Court, but the seat ultimately went to Pierce Butler. He was a member of the Conference of Senior Circuit Judges (now the Judicial Conference of the United States) from 1922 to 1923. His service terminated on March 15, 1924, due to his death in Chicago, Illinois.

References

Sources

External links
 

1860 births
1924 deaths
Justices of the Indiana Supreme Court
Judges of the United States Court of Appeals for the Seventh Circuit
United States court of appeals judges appointed by Theodore Roosevelt
20th-century American judges
University of Michigan alumni
United States federal judges admitted to the practice of law by reading law